The Shaoshan 3B (Chinese: 韶山3B/大3B) is a type of electric locomotive used on the People's Republic of China's national railway system. This locomotive was built by the Ziyang Electric Locomotive Works. The power supply was industrial-frequency single-phase AC, and the axle arrangement Co-Co+Co-Co.

SS3B Electric Locomotive is a twelve shaft fixing reconnection heavy freight electric locomotive which based on two six-axle locomotives connected.

Named locomotives 
 SS3B-5001: "Pioneer in power of God" (Chinese: 先锋力神)

Gallery

Main users 
SS3Bs have been used by several users:
 China Railway Corporation
 Chengdu Railway Bureau
 Nanning Railway Bureau
 Guangzhou Railway Group Co., Ltd.
 Kunming Railway Bureau
 Xi'an Railway Bureau
 Xiaoyi-Liulin Railway
 Dongsheng-Wuhai Railway

Manufacturers 
SS3Bs have been manufactured by several companies:
 Zhuzhou Electric Locomotive Works (0001～0119)
 Datong Electric Locomotive Works (6001～6129)
 Ziyang Locomotive Works (5001～5104)
 Dalian locomotive works (7001)

See also 
 China Railways SS1
 China Railways SS3
 China Railways SS4

References 

Co-Co+Co-Co locomotives
SS3B
25 kV AC locomotives
CNR Datong Electric Locomotive Co. locomotives
Zhuzhou locomotives
Railway locomotives introduced in 2002
Standard gauge locomotives of China